Monkeytown is the third studio album by German electronic music duo Modeselektor. It was released on Monkeytown Records on 30 September 2011. It was produced "100% together in the studio and in one session over the course of ten weeks". In 2014, it was awarded a double silver certification from the Independent Music Companies Association, which indicated sales of at least 40,000 copies throughout Europe.

Critical reception

At Metacritic, which assigns a normalized rating out of 100 to reviews from mainstream critics, the album received an average score of 67, based on 16 reviews, indicating "generally favorable reviews".

Track listing

Personnel
Credits adapted from liner notes.

 Gernot Bronsert – production
 Sebastian Szary – production
 Busdriver – vocals (2)
 Pillow Talk – emergency call (2)
 Thom Yorke – vocals (3, 10)
 Otto von Schirach – vocals (4)
 Miss Platnum – vocals (6)
 PVT – guest appearance (8)
 Siriusmo – synthesizer (8)
 Gordon Boerger – drums (8)
 Anti Pop Consortium – vocals (9)
 Sacha Ring – guitar (11)

Charts

References

External links
 

2011 albums
Modeselektor albums